This article contains a list of countries by length of coastline, in kilometers. A coastline of zero indicates that the country is landlocked.

Overview

The coastline paradox states that a coastline does not have a well-defined length. Measurements of the length of a coastline behave like a fractal, being different at different scale intervals (distance between points on the coastline at which measurements are taken). The smaller the scale interval (meaning the more detailed the measurement), the longer the coastline will be. This "magnifying" effect is greater for convoluted coastlines than for relatively smooth ones.

 Data marked The World Factbook or TWF covers 198 countries and 55 territories, from the book published by the Central Intelligence Agency. In addition to coastline lengths, this is the source of the land area used to calculate the "coast/area ratio" for both TWF and WRI (see below) coastline measurement. This ratio measures how many metres of coastline correspond to every square kilometer of land area. The ratio illustrates the ease of accessibility to the country's coast from every point in its interior. Therefore, an island country like Maldives, or a country carved by the sea like Greece, is more likely to have a high ratio, while a landlocked country will have a ratio of zero. Note that the scales at which The World Factbook figures were measured are not stated, nor is it known whether the figures are all reported using the same scale, thus the figures are not necessarily comparable across different countries.
 Data marked World Resources Institute or WRI covers 182 independent countries and 13 dependencies, based on data calculated in 2000 from the World Vector Shoreline, United States Defense Mapping Agency, 1989. It may include territories whose status have changed. According to their technical notes, the "coastline length was derived from the World Vector Shoreline database at 1:250,000 scale. The estimates (...) were calculated using a Geographic Information System (GIS) and an underlying database consistent for the entire world. The methodology used to estimate length is based on the following: 1) A country's coastline is made up of individual lines, and an individual line has two or more vertices and/or nodes. 2) The length between two vertices is calculated on the surface of a sphere. 3) The sum of the lengths of the pairs of vertices is aggregated for each individual line, and 4) the sum of the lengths of individual lines was aggregated for a country. In general, the coastline length of islands that are part of a country, but are not overseas territories, are included in the coastline estimate for that country (e.g., Canary Islands are included in Spain). Coastline length for overseas territories and dependencies are listed separately. Disputed areas are not included in country or regional totals."

List

See also
 Coastal India
 Coastline of Brazil
 Coastline of China
 Coastline of Malta
 Coastline of New Zealand
 Coastline of the United Kingdom
 Coastline of Western Australia
 List of countries bordering on two or more oceans
 List of U.S. states by coastline

Notes

References

Further reading
 

Coastline length, list by
Geography-related lists
Coastline, country
Coasts

fi:Luettelo valtioiden rantaviivan ja maarajojen pituuksista